Majz District is a district of the Sa'dah Governorate, Yemen. As of 2003, the district had a population of 68,598 inhabitants.

References

Districts of Saada Governorate
Saada Governorate